is a  railway station located in the town of Nakayama, Yamagata Prefecture, Japan, operated by the East Japan Railway Company (JR East).

Lines
Uzen-Kanezawa Station is served by the Aterazawa Line, and is located 9.5 rail kilometers from the terminus of the line at Kita-Yamagata Station.

Station layout
The station has a single side platform serving one bi-directional track. There is no station building, and station is unattended.

History
Uzen-Kanezawa Station began operation on December 25, 1951. With the privatization of the JNR on April 1, 1987, the station came under the control of the East Japan Railway Company.

Surrounding area

See also
List of railway stations in Japan

References

External links 

  Uzen-Kanazawa Station (JR East) 

Railway stations in Yamagata Prefecture
Aterazawa Line
Railway stations in Japan opened in 1951
Nakayama, Yamagata